Donald "Bud" Cook (born June 29, 1956) is a Republican member of the Pennsylvania House of Representatives, who has represented the 50th District since 2023. Prior to redistricting, Cook represented the 49th District from 2017 to 2022.

Biography
Cook was born on June 29, 1956. He graduated from California Area High School. After earning a Bachelor of Science degree from West Virginia Wesleyan College, Cook served two terms from 1986 to 1989 as a Buckhannon, West Virginia councilman.

Pennsylvania House of Representatives
In 2014, Cook unsuccessfully sought election to the Pennsylvania House of Representatives, losing to Democratic incumbent Peter Daley in the 49th District race. In 2016, Daley chose not to run for re-election. Cook once again ran for the 49th District seat and won. He won re-election in 2018 and 2020. Following redistricting, Cook ran for the 50th District seat in 2022, and won.

In 2020, Cook was among 26 Pennsylvania House Republicans who called for the reversal of Joe Biden's certification as the winner of Pennsylvania's electoral votes in the 2020 United States presidential election, citing false claims of election irregularities.

Electoral history

References

External links
– Bud Cook (Republican) official PA House website

|-

Living people
21st-century American politicians
1956 births
People from California, Pennsylvania
Republican Party members of the Pennsylvania House of Representatives
West Virginia Wesleyan College alumni
West Virginia city council members